Proft is a surname of German origin which is derived as a reduced form from either prophet or provost. Notable people with this name include:
 
 Dan Proft (born 1972), an American businessperson, writer and radio talk show host
 Miroslav Proft (1923–2011), a Czech sports shooter
 Pat Proft (born 1947), an American comedy writer and actor
 Werner Proft (1901–?), a German field hockey player

References

German-language surnames